The Tour Championship is a season-ending golf tournament on the Sunshine Tour played at Serengeti Estates in Kempton Park, Gauteng, South Africa. It was first played in March 2018 with prize money of R 1,500,000.

Darren Fichardt won the inaugural event by one stroke from Oliver Bekker. Jean-Paul Strydom won the following year finishing a stroke ahead of the field.

Winners

References

External links
Coverage at the Sunshine Tour's official website

Sunshine Tour events
Golf tournaments in South Africa